Ober Da Bakod is a Philippine television situational comedy series broadcast by GMA Network. Directed by Ariel Ureta, it stars Janno Gibbs, Leo Martinez and Anjo Yllana. It premiered on September 14, 1992. The series concluded on May 27, 1997.

Cast and characters
Lead cast
 Janno Gibbs as Mokong Dayukdok
 Anjo Yllana as Bubuli Dayukdok

Supporting cast
 Donita Rose as Barbie Doll
 Gelli de Belen as Honey Grace
 Malou de Guzman as Lucring (Lucresia Dayukdok)
 Leo Martinez as Robert

Recurring cast
 Danny "Brownie" Pansalin as Brownie
 Donna Cruz as Muning
 Angelu de Leon as Kuting
 Manilyn Reynes as Manirella / Kasoy
 Amanda Page as Quickie
 Onemig Bondoc as Bubwit
 Rufa Mae Quinto as Pegassu
 Assunta de Rossi
 Dale Villar as Flip
 Randy Santiago as Mike

References

External links
 

1992 Philippine television series debuts
1997 Philippine television series endings
Filipino-language television shows
GMA Network original programming
Philippine comedy television series
Philippine television sitcoms
Television series by Viva Television